The Caledonia Bowstring Bridge is a historic bridge in the village of Caledonia, Ohio, United States.  Built in the 1870s but no longer in use, it has been named a historic site.

In 1873, local officials arranged with the Wrought Iron Bridge Company of Canton, Ohio for the construction of a bowstring arch bridge over the Scioto River.  The completed bridge features lattice bracing over the deck, which enabled the design to have both vertical and horizontal support at a low cost.  Its structure combines elements of iron and steel.

In 1976, the Marion County Engineer decided to remove the bridge from its original location in order to build a new bridge at its original location.  Instead of destroying it, the engineer's office moved it to Caledonia, where village officials arranged for its placement across the Olentangy River in order to provide access to a community park.  Four years later, the bridge was listed on the National Register of Historic Places, qualifying both because of its place in Ohio's history and as an example of historically important methods of construction.  Despite village officials' plans, by 2011 the bridge was abandoned and overgrown.

References

Bridges completed in 1873
Road bridges on the National Register of Historic Places in Ohio
Buildings and structures in Marion County, Ohio
National Register of Historic Places in Marion County, Ohio
Former road bridges in the United States
Relocated buildings and structures in Ohio
Tied arch bridges in the United States
Wrought iron bridges in the United States
Steel bridges in the United States